North Wales Gazette was a weekly English language newspaper established in 1808 by the Broster family. The circulation area was North Wales.

References

Newspapers published in Wales
1808 establishments in Wales
Publications established in 1808